The twenty-second season of the Case Closed anime was directed by Yasuichiro Yamamoto and produced by TMS Entertainment and Yomiuri Telecasting Corporation. The series is based on Gosho Aoyama's Case Closed manga series. In Japan, the series is titled  but was changed due to legal issues with the title Detective Conan. The series focuses on the adventures of teenage detective Shinichi Kudo who was turned into a child by a poison called APTX 4869, but continues working as a detective under the alias Conan Edogawa.

The episodes use five pieces of theme music: two opening and three ending themes. The first opening theme is "Try Again" by Mai Kuraki starting from episode 681 to 695. The second opening theme is "Q&A" by B'z starting from episode 696.

The season began airing on January 5, 2013 through November 16, 2013 on Nippon Television Network System in Japan. The season was later collected and released in nine DVD compilations by Shogakukan between January 24, 2014 and October 24, 2014, in Japan.



Episode list

References

2013 Japanese television seasons
Season22